RFA Airsprite (A115) was a Sprite-class spirits tanker of the Royal Fleet Auxiliary. She was laid up in reserve at Devonport in October 1963, and put up for disposal in January 1965.

References

Sprite-class tankers
Tankers of the Royal Fleet Auxiliary
1942 ships